The Game and Playe of Chesse is a book by William Caxton, the first English printer. Published in the 1470s, it is the second book published in English, the first being Recuyell of the Historyes of Troye, also by Caxton. It was based on a book by Jacobus de Cessolis. The book is an "allegory of fixed social structures where each rank has its allotted role."

References

Further reading 
 Wilson, Robert H. "Caxton's Chess Book" . Modern Language Notes 62 (2): 93–102. February 1947. Hosted by JSTOR.

External links 
 The Game and Playe of the Chesse, ed. Jenny Adams (2009) 
 The Game and Playe of Chesse, first edition

1470s books
English-language books
Chess books
Middle English literature
Political fiction